Pumpernickel is a typically dense, slightly sweet rye bread traditionally made with sourdough starter and coarsely ground rye. It is sometimes made with a combination of rye flour and whole rye grains ("rye berries").

At one time it was traditional peasant fare, but largely during the 20th century various forms became popular with other classes through delicatessens and supermarkets. Present-day European and North American pumpernickel differ in several characteristics, including the use of additional leaveners. The North American version may have coloring and flavoring agents, added wheat flour, a higher baking temperature, and a dramatically shortened baking time.

Etymology

The word supposedly stems from an old Bavarian term for "hard", either referring to the process used to grind the grain into flour, or the density of the final bread product. According to Langenscheidts Taschenwörterbuch (1956), it refers to a form of "pumping work".

Old Nick, a familiar name for Satan), or more generally for a malevolent spirit or demon. Hence, pumpernickel means "farting devil" or "devil's fart", a definition accepted by the publisher Random House, and by some English language dictionaries, including the Merriam-Webster Dictionary. The American Heritage Dictionary adds "so named from being hard to digest". A variant of this explanation is also given by the German etymological dictionary Kluge that says the word is older than its usage for this particular type of bread, and may have been used as a mocking name for a person of unrefined manners (a "farting Nick") first. The change of meaning may have been caused by its use as a mocking expression for the (in the eyes of outsiders) unrefined rye bread produced by the Westphalian population.

The Oxford English Dictionary does not commit to any particular etymology for the word. It suggests it may mean a lout or booby, but also says "origin uncertain". The OED currently states the first use in English was in 1756.

Chambers Twentieth Century Dictionary gives the etymology as being the German word for a rackety goblin, a coarse lout, and rye-bread - possibly from its giving forth a sound like pump when struck.

A false folk etymology involves Napoleon, who, while invading Germany, asked for bread and was served dark Westphalian rye. According to the folktale, Napoleon declared that this was not suitable bread for himself, the emperor, but was bread for Nickel (or Nicole), his horse: "". In a variation of the same basic story, Napoleon declared that the bread was no good for him, but was only good for his horse: "". However, the name Nickel is not confirmed for any of Napoleon's many horses. Additional folk etymology grew from a "witty interpretation", proposed by seventeenth-century satirist Johann Balthasar Schupp, that the bread was only "good for Nicol", a nickname for a weak or puny horse.

Europe
Pumpernickel has been long associated with the Westphalia region of Germany, first referred to in print in 1450. Although it is not known whether this and other early references refer to precisely the bread that came to be known as Pumpernickel, Westphalian pumpernickel is distinguished by use of coarse rye meal and a very long baking period, which gives the bread its characteristic dark color. Like most traditional all-rye breads, pumpernickel is made with an acidic sourdough starter, which preserves dough structure. The acid inactivates the rye protein, amylase, which converts the starch to sugar. That sourdough starter is sometimes augmented, or replaced, in commercial baking by adding citric acid or lactic acid along with commercial yeast.

Traditional German pumpernickel contains no coloring agents, instead relying on the Maillard reaction to produce its characteristic deep brown color, its sweet, dark chocolate, coffee flavor, and its earthy aroma. Like French sandwich bread, or a pullman loaf, Westphalian pumpernickel has little or no crust. It is very similar to rye Vollkornbrot, a dense rye bread with large amounts of whole grains added.

Pumpernickel varieties are popular in the Netherlands, under the name fries roggebrood (Frisian rye bread—Friesland is just over the border from the German Westphalia), where it has been a common part of the diet for centuries, and in Denmark where  is a staple. German pumpernickel is often sold sliced in small packets in supermarkets, where it may be paired with caviar, smoked salmon, sturgeon, and other expensive products on an hors d'oeuvres tray.

North America
While some commercial bakeries mass-produce pumpernickel bread for wholesale, many American shops, stores, and families use traditional recipes and bake times. Some mass-produced pumpernickel in North America may incorporate natural colorants such as molasses, caramel color, coffee, or cocoa powder among others to imitate the various shades of brown of traditional German pumpernickel.  As is common modern commercial baking practice, commercial bakeries often add wheat flour to provide gluten structure and increase rise, and commercial yeast to quicken the rise, compared to a traditional sourdough. In order to increase production and profits, the slow baking characteristic of German pumpernickel is forgone, resulting in a loaf indiscernible from dark rye bread. Some shops and boutique bakeries in America still use centuries old recipes, often also selling other German foods.  Pumpernickel is also a popular bagel flavor in New York.

See also
 List of breads
 Rugbrød
 Schwarzbrot
 Jewish rye bread
 Pumper Nic

References

External links
pumpernickel at the Merriam-Webster Online Dictionary
How to make an American pumpernickel bread 
How to make authentic German pumpernickel bread
 Description of Schupp "bon pour Nicol" quotation

German breads
Jewish American cuisine
Jewish baked goods
Jewish breads
Rye breads
Sourdough breads
Westphalian cuisine